Kohneh Hesar (also Romanized as Kohneh Ḩeşār; also known as Kūh-e Nasār and Kūh-ī-Nasār) is a village in Mehraban-e Sofla Rural District, Gol Tappeh District, Kabudarahang County, Hamadan Province, Iran. At the 2006 census, its population was 323, in 70 families.

References 

Populated places in Kabudarahang County